A clown car is a prop in a circus clown routine, which involves an implausibly large number of clowns emerging from a very small car. The first performance of this routine was in the Cole Bros. Circus during the 1950s. The effect is produced by simply removing all of a car's internal  components—including the door panels, the headliner and any interior barrier to the trunk—and then filling the enlarged space with as many clowns as possible. Greg DeSanto of the International Clown Hall of Fame estimates that somewhere between 14 and 21 clowns and their props could fit into a car prepared in this manner.

See also
 Clown bicycle

References

Circus equipment
Clowning